João Baptista Borges (born 4 January 1964, Luanda) is an Angolan academic and politician who served as Minister of Energy and Water under Presidents José Eduardo dos Santos and João Lourenço from 2012 to date. He was a professor of Engineering at Agostinho Neto University and was a member of the MPLA political bureau. He speaks three foreign languages, English, French and Spanish fluently. 

French, English, Spanish.

Education 
Borges studied for a bachelor’s degree in Electrical Engineering at the Agostinho Neto University in 1991, and then went for a master’s degree in Electrical and Computer Engineering Universidade Nova de Lisboa, Portugal in 2011.

Career 
Borges entered the civil service in 1991 as Trainee mechanical engineer, ENE / North Regional Directorate until 1992 when he was appointed professor of Engineering at Agostinho Neto Universityo and served concurrently in other positions until 2008 when became Deputy Minister of Energy. From 2010 to 2011, he served as Secretary of State for Energy and from 2012 to date, he serves as minister of Energy and Water.

References 

Living people
1964 births
Angolan academics
Angolan politicians
Agostinho Neto University alumni
MPLA politicians
Energy and water ministers of Angola
People from Luanda
21st-century Angolan people